Sir Charles Forster, 1st Baronet (3 August 1815 – 26 July 1891) was an English Liberal politician who sat in the House of Commons from 1852 to 1891.

Biography
Forster was born at Worcester, the only son of Charles Smith Forster of Lysways
Hall, Rugeley, and his wife Elizabeth Emery. His father was a banker of Walsall and had been Member of Parliament for Walsall and High Sheriff of Staffordshire. Forster was educated at Worcester College, Oxford and called to the bar at Inner Temple in 1843. He was a Deputy Lieutenant and Justice of the Peace for Staffordshire.

Forster stood unsuccessfully for Walsall in 1847, but in 1852, he was returned unopposed as MP for Walsall. He lived at Lysways Hall, Staffordshire, and was created a baronet, of Lysways Hall, in March 1874. He remained member for Walsall until his death at the age of 75, in 1891. He made 210 contributions in the House of Commons.  Forster supported women's suffrage in 1875, writing to the Manchester-based Women's Suffrage Journal that he "[regarded] [it] as a measure of progress, and one which cannot logically be resisted."

Forster married Frances Catherine Surtees of Newcastle upon Tyne in 1840. His son, Charles, succeeded to the baronetcy.

References

External links 
 

1815 births
1891 deaths
Alumni of Worcester College, Oxford
Baronets in the Baronetage of the United Kingdom
Liberal Party (UK) MPs for English constituencies
UK MPs 1852–1857
UK MPs 1857–1859
UK MPs 1859–1865
UK MPs 1865–1868
UK MPs 1868–1874
UK MPs 1874–1880
UK MPs 1880–1885
UK MPs 1885–1886
UK MPs 1886–1892
Politicians from Worcester, England